Seminole County is a county located in the southwestern corner of U.S. state of Georgia. As of the 2020 census, the population was 9,147. The county seat is Donalsonville.

History
The state constitutional amendment to create the county was proposed July 8, 1920, and ratified November 2. The area for the new county was taken from land which was originally part of Decatur and Early counties. It is named for the Seminole tribe of Native Americans, who once lived in the Chattahoochee River basin within the county, before European settlement forced their move to the Florida Everglades. According to legend, thecelebrated Seminole chief Osceola was born in what is today Seminole County.

Geography

The bulk of Seminole County is located in the Spring Creek sub-basin of the ACF River Basin (Apalachicola-Chattahoochee-Flint River Basin). The county's entire western border with Florida is located in the Lower Chattahoochee River sub-basin of the same ACF River Basin. A tiny southeastern corner of Seminole County, all part of Lake Seminole, is located in the Lower Flint River sub-basin of the same larger ACF River Basin. It is the only county in Georgia that borders both Alabama and Florida.

Major highways

  U.S. Route 84
  State Route 38
  State Route 39
  State Route 45
  State Route 91
  State Route 91 Alternate
  State Route 253
  State Route 285
  State Route 374

Adjacent counties
 Miller County (northeast)
 Decatur County (east)
 Jackson County, Florida (southwest)
 Houston County, Alabama (northwest)
 Early County (north-northwest)

Demographics

2000 census
As of the census of 2000, there were 9,369 people, 3,573 households, and 2,597 families living in the county.  The population density was 39 people per square mile (15/km2).  There were 4,742 housing units at an average density of 20 per square mile (8/km2).  The racial makeup of the county was 61.75% White, 34.66% Black or African American, 0.18% Native American, 0.18% Asian, 2.79% from other races, and 0.45% from two or more races.  3.70% of the population were Hispanic or Latino of any race.

There were 3,573 households, out of which 29.90% had children under the age of 18 living with them, 51.10% were married couples living together, 17.90% had a female householder with no husband present, and 27.30% were non-families. 24.30% of all households were made up of individuals, and 11.50% had someone living alone who was 65 years of age or older.  The average household size was 2.54 and the average family size was 3.01.

In the county, the population was spread out, with 26.20% under the age of 18, 8.60% from 18 to 24, 26.40% from 25 to 44, 23.00% from 45 to 64, and 15.80% who were 65 years of age or older.  The median age was 38 years. For every 100 females there were 91.00 males.  For every 100 females age 18 and over, there were 86.60 males.

The median income for a household in the county was $27,094, and the median income for a family was $33,221. Males had a median income of $25,909 versus $20,194 for females. The per capita income for the county was $14,635.  About 15.80% of families and 23.20% of the population were below the poverty line, including 35.10% of those under age 18 and 18.60% of those age 65 or over.

2010 census
As of the 2010 United States Census, there were 8,729 people, 3,509 households, and 2,471 families living in the county. The racial makeup of the county was 63.2% white, 33.1% black or African American, 0.4% Asian, 0.1% American Indian, 0.1% from other races, and 0.8% from two or more races. Those of Hispanic or Latino origin made up 2.3% of the population. In terms of ancestry, 34.8% were American, 12.6% were Irish, and 6.0% were English.

Of the 3,509 households, 30.4% had children under the age of 18 living with them, 47.8% were married couples living together, 17.9% had a female householder with no husband present, 29.6% were non-families, and 26.4% of all households were made up of individuals. The average household size was 2.46 and the average family size was 2.95. The median age was 43.7 years.

The median income for a household in the county was $32,666 and the median income for a family was $38,339. Males had a median income of $33,965 versus $23,896 for females. The per capita income for the county was $19,263. About 19.3% of families and 25.4% of the population were below the poverty line, including 37.2% of those under age 18 and 15.7% of those age 65 or over.

2020 census

As of the 2020 United States Census, there were 9,147 people, 3,363 households, and 2,162 families residing in the county.

Communities
 Donalsonville (county seat)
 Iron City

Politics

See also

 National Register of Historic Places listings in Seminole County, Georgia
List of counties in Georgia

References

External links
 Official Website of Donalsonville-Seminole County Chamber of Commerce Includes the City of Donalsoville and Iron City
 Seminole County School System Includes the City of Donalsonville, Iron, and Entirely Seminole County
 Seminole County Clerk of Court

 
Georgia (U.S. state) counties
Georgia placenames of Native American origin
1920 establishments in Georgia (U.S. state)
Populated places established in 1920